The Eighth Mountain is the twelfth studio album by the Italian symphonic power metal band Rhapsody of Fire. It was released on 22 February 2019 via AFM Records.

The album is the first chapter for a new saga, written by Alex Staropoli and Roberto De Micheli, entitled The Nephilim's Empire Saga. It is the first saga not written by Luca Turilli, who had left the band in 2011. It is also the first studio album without vocalist Fabio Lione, and the first without longtime drummer Alex Holzwarth since 1998's Symphony of Enchanted Lands. They were replaced by Giacomo Voli and Manu Lotter respectively, though it would be the only studio album with drummer Manu Lotter.

A music video for "Rain of Fury" was released on 11 January 2019.

Concept 
The posthumous narration by the late Christopher Lee at the end of the album explains the concept:

Track listing

Personnel 
Credits for The Eighth Mountain adapted from liner notes.

Rhapsody of Fire
 Alex Staropoli – keyboards, production, engineer, recording, orchestra and choir arrangements, songwriting, lyrics
 Roberto De Micheli – guitars, songwriting, lyrics
 Alessandro Sala – bass
 Giacomo Voli – lead vocals, lyrics
 Manu Lotter – drums

Additional personnel
 Christopher Lee – posthumous narration on track 12
 Manuel Staropoli – flute, oboe
 Manuel Tomadin – harpsichord
 Vito Lo Re – orchestra conductor, scoring
 Bulgarian National Radio Symphony Orchestra – orchestra

Choir
 Alex Mari, Angelo Guidetti, Beatrice Bini, Chiara Tricarico, Enrico Correggia, Fabio Sambenini, Gabriele Gozzi, Marco Vincini, Monica Marozzi, Niccolò Porcedda, Raffaele Albanese, Stefano Ciceri, Stefano Corradini

Production
 Karsten Koch – photography
 Alex Charleux – cover art
 Sebastian "Seeb" Levermann – engineer, recording, mixing, mastering
 Marco Straccioni – recording, mixing (orchestra)
 Slav Slavtchev – orchestra contractor
 Maurizio Assenti – layout

Charts

References 

2019 albums
AFM Records albums
Rhapsody of Fire albums